Kennedy Glacier may mean:

 Kennedy Glacier (Antarctica), a glacier in Antarctica
 Kennedy Glacier (Washington), a glacier on Glacier Peak, Washington, USA